WCNV is a Public Radio formatted broadcast radio station licensed to Heathsville, Virginia, serving the Kilmarnock/Warsaw area.  WCNV is owned and operated by Commonwealth Public Broadcasting Corporation and is a repeater station of WCVE-FM.

References

External links
 WCVE Public Radio Online
 

2007 establishments in Virginia
Public radio stations in the United States
NPR member stations
Radio stations established in 2007
CNV